Margaret Williams-Weir (1940 - 1 October 2015) was an Australian educator, researcher and Royal Canadian Naval officer. Williams-Weir was the first Aboriginal person to matriculate to an Australian University (shared with Geoffrey Penny), attend an Australian University and graduate from an Australian University.

Williams-Weir was a descendant of the Gumbaynggirr and Malera of the Bundjalung people of northern New South Wales.

Education 
Williams-Weir graduated from Casino High School in 1956 on a 50 pounds Aboriginal Welfare Board Scholarship. After being offered a scholarship by the University of Queensland, she enrolled in a Bachelor of Arts in 1957. After a semester,  she took up an Abschol Award to study at the University of Melbourne, where she completed in a Diploma of Physical Education in 1959, becoming the first Indigenous Australian with a university qualification. She was offered a scholarship to live at the University Women's College while completing her studies from 1958-1959.

Williams-Weir went on to complete a Bachelor of Education, a Research Master's degree (with Honours) and a Doctor of Philosophy, with her thesis entitled Indigenous Australians and Universities: A Study of Postgraduate Students' Experiences in Learning Research at the University of New England in 2001.

Naval service 
Williams-Weir was a member of the Royal Canadian Navy from 1966 to 1969.

References 

1940s births
2015 deaths
20th-century Australian educators
20th-century Australian women
University of Melbourne women
University of Melbourne alumni
Indigenous Australian people
Bundjalung people